The 1929–30 Cornell Big Red men's ice hockey season was the 25th season of play for the program. The teams was coached by Nick Bawlf in his 10th season.

Season
Cornell began the season like it had many before; struggling to get usable ice during a warm winter. Sure enough, the ice wasn't good enough for the team's first scheduled game and the match with Union was postponed. The following week the team headed to Clinton to face Hamilton and, in a surprising result, routed the Continentals 6–0. It was the most goals Cornell had scored in a game in six years and gave hope for a program that was typically bereft of offensive firepower.

Most of that hope evaporated during the next game when Clarkson throttled Cornell 0–8. The team was able to get several practices in afterwards, during the examination break, and the team returned much better prepared for their next opponent. Cornell made swift work of Colgate, again showing their scoring potential with a 7–1 victory. The game saw the debut of Shields I net for Cornell and coach Bawlf was hoping he had found a new star. Shields took a puck over his eye during practice and sported a sizable gash in the next game against St. Lawrence. Cornell lambasted the Saints, scoring seemingly at will against a team that had given them fits over the previous two years. The win ensured that Cornell would have at least a .500 record for the year and saw every reserve member see some playing time.

The team's next game came just three days later and the lack of rest didn't blunt the team's scoring. Cornell won its 4th game of the year with a 7–1 score, giving the Big Red their first winning season in eight years. The squad had another short break before heading down to New Jersey for their final game of the year. Despite all that they had accomplished, Princeton easily handled the Big Red, serving notice that Cornell still had a ways to go before they could compete with the college hockey elite.

Roster

Standings

Schedule and results

|-
!colspan=12 style=";" | Regular Season

† Cornell records have the St. Lawrence game being played on January 25 and the score as 4–2 in their favor.

References

Cornell Big Red men's ice hockey seasons
Cornell
Cornell
Cornell
Cornell